The  is an archaeological site and museum located in the Maruyama and Yasuta neighborhoods to the southwest of central Aomori in Aomori Prefecture in northern Japan, containing the ruins of a very large Jōmon period settlement. The ruins of a  settlement were discovered in 1992, when Aomori Prefecture started surveying the area for a planned baseball stadium. Archaeologists have used this site to further their understanding of the transition to sedentism and the life of the Jōmon people. Excavation has led to the discovery of storage pits, above ground storage and long houses. These findings demonstrate a change in the structure of the community, architecture, and organizational behaviors of these people. Because of the extensive information and importance, this site was designated as a Special National Historical Site of Japan in 2000., and a UNESCO World Heritage Site as part of the Jōmon Prehistoric Sites in Northern Japan collection in 2021. Today the public can visit the site, its various reconstructions of Jōmon structures, and a museum that displays and houses artifacts collected on the site, which have collectively been designated an Important Cultural Property

Early history

The Sannai-Maruyama settlement was occupied from the middle of the Early Jōmon period to the end of the Middle Jōmon period (3900 – 2200 BC), and is the largest Jōmon settlement yet discovered in Japan. It is located on a 20 meter high fluvial terrace on the right bank of the Okidate River, at the tip of a ridge extending southwest from the Hakkōda Mountains.

The area was first settled around 3900 BC. The first settlers of the site lived in pit houses. Over 500 pit dwellings have been found on site. Additionally, they stored their food in pits, which allowed them to hide it when they left the site since the occupants were still semi-nomadic.

Around 2900 BC, the inhabitants became more sedentary. They began to store food above ground in elevated buildings rather than in pits. Also, longhouses began showing up around this time. Long houses were large, oval-shaped structures. Scholars believe longhouses were used for meeting places, workshops, or living space. Pit houses were still being inhabited at the same time that longhouses existed on the landscape.

One of Sannai-Maruyama's most famous structures, a reconstruction of a large six-pillared building, was originally built around 2,600 BC. This structure consisted of six large chestnut pillars that are believed to have held a series of platforms. Evidence for similar large wooden structures has been found at other sites in Japan and the rest of Eurasia, including a wooden precursor to Stonehenge. Most of the wood structure, like other biological remains at the site, deteriorated due to the acidity of the soil; however, the bottoms of the pillars were preserved because they were waterlogged due to their proximity to a marsh. Due to its large size, it is believed that this structure could have functioned as a monument, watchtower, or a lighthouse overlooking Mutsu Bay (which was larger than at present). Remains of other six-pillared buildings from different time periods have been found throughout the site. Many of the post holes from these buildings overlap each other, which suggests that the structures were being rebuilt in the same location and facing the same direction.

The site also contained two middens with domestic refuse, two large mounds, containing refuse, including ceremonial artifacts. A large amount of earthenware and stoneware were recovered from these middens, including approximately 2,000 clay figures, wood products, bones and antler objects and tools, and fragments of baskets and lacquerware. Some objects made of jade, amber and obsidian were not native to the area, and could only have come to this site via trade. The site also contained over 500 burial pits for adult remains, and numerous jar-burials for infants. Some burials, hypothesized to be for the social elite, were enclosed within stone circles.

The settlement of Sannai-Maruyama ended around 2300 BC due to unknown reasons. Its abandonment was likely due to the population's subsistence economy being unable to result in sustained growth, with its end being spurred on by the reduced amount of natural resources during the neoglaciation. However, during the Heian period, a portion of the site was resettled by new inhabitants who also built pit dwellings, and during the Muromachi period, a portion of the site was occupied by a medieval fortification.

Modern history
The presence of ruins at Sannai-Maruyama was known even during the Edo period, as travelers through the area commented in finding pottery shards and clay figurines. The first survey was conducted by Keio University and the Aomori City Board of Education from 1953 to 1967 and from 1976 and 1987, the Board of Education of Aomori Prefecture and the city of Aomori conducted further excavations on the southern part of the site.

The true significance of the site was not recognized until the start of construction of a prefectural baseball stadium in 1992. Due to the large number of finds during the rescue archaeology conducted at the time, including the foundations for the large six-pillared building in June 1994, Aomori Prefecture cancelled the baseball stadium project and decided to preserve the site in August 1994 as an archaeological park.  After this was announced a number of the excavations were backfilled to protect the site. Since 1994, around 26 additional test excavations have been done. These excavations have resulted in around 40% of the site being excavated.

Administratively, the archaeological site and the museum had been separate entities, but now function as a single historic site. After their merger, entrance fees to the archaeological site and museum began to be collected in the museum building.

The Sannai-Maruyama Site is the centerpiece of the Jōmon Prehistoric Sites in Northern Japan, a group of Jōmon period archaeological sites in Hokkaidō and northern Tōhoku that was recommended by Japan in 2020 for inclusion to the UNESCO World Heritage List, under criteria iii and iv. It was first placed on the World Heritage Tentative List in 2009, and was officially inscribed on the World Heritage List on 27 July 2021. 

The site hosted as the collection point for Aomori Prefecture's Paralympic flame that was collected from around Japan to be sent to the New National Stadium in Tokyo as part of 2020 Summer Paralympics torch relay.

Interpretation
The Sannai-Maruyama Site was inhabited by hunter-gatherers roughly between 3900 BC2900 BC. Over this period of time, the site changed from a seasonal camp, to the home of a more mobile society, and finally to a settled village. Evidence of this sedentary lifestyle can be found in the form of intense use of natural resources such as nuts, fish, and a wide diversity of plants, as well as changes in storage facilities.

Initially, the Sannai-Maruyama site was used on a temporary basis. There were large pits used for storage and can be concealed since they were underground, which was preferred by mobile populations in many parts of the world. A shift occurred around 2900 BC from the use of storage pits to elevated storehouses, revealed by pillar-supported structures that lack the fire pits of the pit-dwellings. An interpretation of this change was that the site's population had become more sedentary.

Later in the site's record, evidence of longhouses that were built along with some pit houses were found at the site. The increase in housing also shows a more sedentary lifestyle and an increase in population. Also, the large pillar structure dates to this time period. Construction on this scale implies the existence of a coordinated labor force due to the sheer size of these posts. The placement of the posts would have required the cooperation of several people. Interpretations of the use of this large post-supported platform is that it was a base for a tower, or even a shrine.

The impact of neoglaciation on Sannai-Maruyama Site's disbandment around 2300 BC has contemporary implications. A decrease in temperature by  influenced the collapse of the settlement and civilizations in other parts of the world. The effects of global warming in relation to the effects the ancient cooling had on the site's population reveal the impact such a change in temperature can have on human society.

See also

Jōmon Archaeological Sites in Hokkaidō, Northern Tōhoku, and other regions
List of Historic Sites of Japan (Aomori)
List of Special Places of Scenic Beauty, Special Historic Sites and Special Natural Monuments

References

External links

Official website 
Official website 
 "Sannai Maruyama." Jomon Archaeological Sites. Retrieved 28 July 2016.
 "Sannai Maruyama excavation report" The Comprehensive Database of Archaeological Site Reports in Japan.

Aomori (city)
Archaeological sites in Japan
Buildings and structures in Aomori (city)
History of Aomori Prefecture
Jōmon period
Special Historic Sites
Museums in Aomori Prefecture
Tourist attractions in Aomori Prefecture
Important Cultural Properties of Japan
Archaeological parks